Agni Putrudu is a 1987 Indian Telugu-language action film, produced by Venkat Akkineni under the Annapurna Studios banner and directed by K. Raghavendra Rao. It stars Akkineni Nageswara Rao, Nagarjuna, Sarada, Rajani and Sivaji Ganesan, with music composed by Chakravarthy.

Plot
Hari Hara Bharadwaja, an orthodox Brahmin & religious scholar, leads a happy family life with his ideal wife Brahmaramba, son Kaalidasu, and daughters Gayatri & Jahnavi. He believes nonviolence & humanity is greater than caste & clans and craves his son on the same path. At present, Bharadwaja attains the highest power corridor as a chieftain to a religious organization Viswachaitanya Gurukulapeetam. Parallelly, malicious Zamindar Bhupati Rayudu sublets authority over the lands under the Peetam, by trampling tribes under his feet. Knowing it, Bharadwaja seizes his tyrant and allots the lands to the tribes. So, flared-up Bhupati decides to malice Bharadwaj clamping Deeshithulu (Gollapudi Maruti Rao) the committee member. Meanwhile, Bharadwaja takes debt from a lender Narahari (Rallapalli) to perform Jahnavi's marriage when Bhupati clutches Narahari. At the same time, Inspector Sampath Kumar (Chalapati Rao) the henchman of Bhupati molests Manga (Mucharlla Aruna) daughter of Bharadwaja's aide Srisailam (P.L.Narayana). Here, Bharadwaja files a case but the malefactor acquits with fake alibis and by that time, Manga is pregnant. Simultaneously, Bharadwaja's elder daughter Gayatri conceives when her father-in-law Govardhanam (Nutan Prasad) warns her to return with his heir. Both of them deliver at once, but unfortunately, Gayatri miscarries when panicked Brahmaramba secretly replaces Manga's child. Thereafter, she divulges the reality to Bharadwaja and pleads for pardon. Being cognizant of it, Bhupati conspires which makes Govardhanam furious who evades Gayatri and Jahnavi also necked out by her in-laws'.

Right now, Deeshithulu inflames and accuses Bharadwaja of contradicting the religion. Moreover, Bhupati ruses by indicting him in a theft using Narahari for which he is ostracized. Overhearing it, Manga steps to proclaim the actuality but she is slain when Bharadwaja adopts her orphan child. Howbeit enraged Kaali revolts against Narahari and is sentenced. In prison, he is acquainted with a rebel Chaitanya, a victim of Bhupati's cruelty. Before dying, he inspires and entrusts his responsibility to Kaali. Soon after his release, Bharadwaja learns the aim of Kaali when a rift arises between father & son which makes Kaali leave the house. After that, Kaali mingles with the tribes and confronts Bhupati. In that process, he meets his love Usha (Rajani), daughter of Bhupati's brother. After identifying the factually she too conjoins him. Further Kaali set rights for his sisters' families. Thereafter, he kidnaps Narahari to uncover the truth. Exploiting it, Bhupati kills him and criminates Kaali. Eventually, he triggers Bharadwaja and makes him encounter Kaali where he understands his son's virtue. Suddenly, Bhupati attacks them in which Bharadwaja is seriously injured. Hence, they abscond, accordingly, Bhupati captures Bharadwaja's daughters and slaughters the baby. Spotting it, Kaali bursts out. At last, Bharadwaja loses his patience, deviates from his path, and eliminates Bhupati. Finally, Bharadwaja affirms Kaali that he must live for the welfare of society.

Cast

 Akkineni Nageswara Rao as Hari Hara Bharadwaja
 Nagarjuna as Kaalidasu
 Rajani as Usha 
 Sarada as Brahmaramba
 Sivaji Ganesan as Chaitanya  
 Satyanarayana as Bhupathi Rayudu
 Nutan Prasad as Govardhanam
 Gollapudi Maruti Rao as Deeshithulu 
 Rallapalli as Narahari
 Suthi Velu as Anantham 
 P. L. Narayana as Srisilam
 Chalapathi Rao as Inspector Sampath Kumar
 Bhimeswara Rao as Judge
 Balaji as Ganapathi
 Vidya Sagar as Bharadwaja's son-in-law 
 Chitti Babu as Ganapathi's henchmen 
 Mucharlla Aruna as Manga 
 Jyothi as Gayatri 
 Rajitha as Jahnavi  
 Krishnaveni as Nurse
 Chandrika as Sakkubai's Sister
 Dubbing Janaki as Govardhanam's wife
 Tatineni Rajeswari as Deeshithulu's wife 
 Y. Vijaya as Sakkubai

Soundtrack 
The music was composed by Chakravarthy. Lyrics were written by Veturi.

References

External links 

1980s Telugu-language films
1987 films
Films about discrimination
Films about social issues in India
Films about the caste system in India
Films directed by K. Raghavendra Rao
Films scored by K. Chakravarthy
Films with screenplays by the Paruchuri brothers